Brujo is an album by the American country rock band New Riders of the Purple Sage.  It is their fifth studio album, and their sixth album overall.  It was recorded in 1974 and released that same year by Columbia Records.

Brujo was the first New Riders album to feature ex-Byrd Skip Battin.  Battin had replaced Dave Torbert as the New Riders' bass player after Torbert left to form Kingfish.

One single was released in conjunction with the album—"You Angel You"/"Parson Brown".

Track listing
"Old Man Noll" (John Dawson) – 2:44
"Ashes of Love" (Jack Anglin, Johnnie Wright) – 2:14
"You Angel You" (Bob Dylan) – 2:43
"Instant Armadillo Blues" (Dawson) – 2:52
"Workingman's Woman" (Troy Seals, Will Jennings, Don Goodman) – 2:44
"On the Amazon" (Skip Battin, Kim Fowley) – 3:34
"Big Wheels" (Battin, Fowley) – 3:00
"Singing Cowboy" (Battin, Fowley) – 3:57
"Crooked Judge" (Robert Hunter, David Nelson) – 2:59
"Parson Brown" (Dawson) – 3:06
"Neon Rose" (Battin, Fowley) – 4:24

Personnel

New Riders of the Purple Sage
John Dawson - guitar, vocals
David Nelson - guitar, mandolin, vocals
Spencer Dryden - drums, vocals
Skip Battin - bass, vocals
Buddy Cage - steel guitar

Guest musicians
Neil Larsen - keyboards
Mark Naftalin - keyboards
Ed Freeman - mellotron
Dan Patiris - English horn
Armando Peraza - bongos

Production
Producer: Ed Freeman
Recording Engineer: Bob Edwards/Kurt Kinzel
Art Direction: n/a
Photography: Urve Kuusik
Artwork: Gage Taylor

References

1974 albums
Columbia Records albums
New Riders of the Purple Sage albums